François Hus was an 18th-century French comedian and head of troupe born 7 September 1695 in Marseille and died before 1774.

Family 
The son of  Jérôme Hus and Marguerite Pageot, called Desforges, he was the eldest member of the Hus family and with his brother Barthélemy, would lead a traveling troupe known as the "Hus brothers's troupe."

In 1730, he married Françoise-Nicole Gravillon, actress and playwright from Lyon. From this union were born in particular the dancer Jean-Baptiste and Adélaïde-Louise-Pauline, future Mlle Hus of the Comédie-Française.

18th-century French male actors
French male stage actors
French theatre managers and producers
1695 births
Entertainers from Marseille
Year of death missing